
Gmina Kalisz Pomorski is an urban-rural gmina (administrative district) in Drawsko County, West Pomeranian Voivodeship, in north-western Poland.

Villages
Apart from the town of Kalisz Pomorski, Gmina Kalisz Pomorski contains the villages and settlements of Biały Zdrój, Borowo, Bralin, Cybowo, Dębsko, Giżyno, Głębokie, Jasnopole, Jaworze, Karwiagać, Krężno, Lipinki, Łowno, Pepłówek, Pniewy, Pomierzyn, Poźrzadło Małe, Poźrzadło Wielkie, Prostynia, Pruszcz, Siekiercze, Sienica, Skotniki, Ślizno, Smugi, Stara Korytnica, Stara Studnica, Suchowo, Tarnice and Wierzchucin.

Neighbouring gminas
Gmina Kalisz Pomorski is bordered by the gminas of Dobrzany, Drawno, Drawsko Pomorskie, Ińsko, Mirosławiec, Recz, Tuczno, Wierzchowo and Złocieniec.

References
Polish official population figures 2006

Kalisz Pomorski
Drawsko County